Sally Armstrong may refer to:

 Sally Armstrong (The Bill), a character from British TV series, The Bill
 Sally Armstrong (journalist) (born 1943), Canadian journalist and author
 Sally Armstrong, character in Dark Eyes (audio drama)